Berk Çetin (born 2 February 2000) is a Turkish professional footballer who plays as a defender for Belgian club Olympic Charleroi. He was born in Germany and represented both Germany and Turkey on junior levels.

Career
On 18 January 2020, Çetin signed with Kasımpaşa from Borussia Mönchengladbach. Çetin made his professional debut with Kasımpaşa in a 3–2 Turkish Cup win over Alanyaspor on 22 January 2020.

On 2 October 2020, Çetin joined Dutch Eerste Divisie club Helmond Sport on a season-long loan. He was recalled from the loan early in 2021, but remained on the bench in all remaining 2020–21 Süper Lig games for Kasımpaşa.

On 8 September 2021, he moved on a new loan to Turgutluspor. On 3 February 2022, Çetin joined Dornbirn in Austria on loan.

References

External links
 
 
 
 

2000 births
People from Würselen
Sportspeople from Cologne (region)
Footballers from North Rhine-Westphalia
German people of Turkish descent
Living people
Turkish footballers
Association football defenders
Turkey youth international footballers
German footballers
Germany youth international footballers
Borussia Mönchengladbach II players
Kasımpaşa S.K. footballers
Helmond Sport players
Turgutluspor footballers
FC Dornbirn 1913 players
R. Olympic Charleroi Châtelet Farciennes players
Regionalliga players
Eerste Divisie players
TFF Second League players
2. Liga (Austria) players
Turkish expatriate footballers
Expatriate footballers in the Netherlands
Turkish expatriate sportspeople in the Netherlands
Expatriate footballers in Austria
Turkish expatriate sportspeople in Austria
Expatriate footballers in Belgium
Turkish expatriate sportspeople in Belgium